Ghazi Saiyyed Salar Sahu or Saiyed Salar Dawood or Sahu Bin Ataullah Alavi or Salar Sahu was commander in the army of Sultan Mahmud Ghaznavi who came to the Indian subcontinent in the early 11th century.

Salar Sahu was a descendant of Muhammad ibn al-Hanafiyyah, son of Ali. His father's name was Tahir Ataullah, and his son was Ghazi Saiyyad Salar Masud. He had two brothers one of them was Syed Maroofuddin Ghazi. He was probably a brother-in-law of Sultan Mahmud Ghaznavi, purportedly married to the latter's sister, Sitr-i-Mu'alla. He came to India along with Sultan Mahmud Ghaznavi as his army commander.

He died nearly 1000 years ago in Satrikh and is buried there.

Tomb of Sayed Salar Sahu
At his grave the people gather to pilgrimage during the full moon of the Hindu month of Jyeshta during the summer. There is a five-day-long urs during which thousands of devotees pray. His tomb is known as "Budhe Baba ki mazar" (Grand Master's Mausoleum).

References

External links
 Mirati Mas’udi by ‘Abdur Rahman Chishti

People from Barabanki, Uttar Pradesh
Ghaznavid Empire
Medieval India
Ghaznavid generals